Regardt Dreyer (born 10 December 1982, Johannesburg) is a professional South African Rugby footballer currently playing for Aviva Premiership side Northampton Saints. His preferred position is at Prop.

Career
Dreyer signed for Northampton Saints along with Juandré Kruger, another fellow South African Rugby player on 6 October 2008 but did not officially join until after his Currie Cup commitments. Although he did not play for the saints in his first season, he played for their reserves team (the Wanderers) helping them winning the Guinness A League. He made his first start the following season.

References

External links
Northampton Profile

South African rugby union players
1982 births
Living people
Northampton Saints players
Rugby union players from KwaZulu-Natal
Rugby union props